The Alamüdün or Alamedin river is a left tributary of the Chu in Northern Kyrgyzstan.

Water from the river is substantially redirected for irrigation, and the Alamüdün District of Chüy Region is named after the river.

The average rate of water flow is 6.33  cubic meters per second, with a maximum of 300 cubic meters per second and a minimum of 0.74 meters per second.

The source of the Alamüdün is a glacier on the northern slope of the Kyrgyz Ala-Too range.  In the upper parts the flow is turbulent, and it passes through narrow mountain gorges.  As it enters the Chüy Valley, the river bed widens and becomes less steep.  The river flows through the city of Bishkek, where its channel has been reinforced with concrete barriers, from south to north.

Within the watershed of the river there are 22 small lakes with a total surface area of 0.8 km² and 53 glaciers with an area of 74.2 km².

Snow-melt in the summer (May through September) results in high waters, and low-water occurs in the winter.  The river has 33 small tributaries, the largest of which is the Chungkurchak, at 19 km long.

Social import 

There is a water draw-off at the entrance to the Alamüdün Gorge in the Chüy Valley, not far from the village of Kök-Jar.

Villages on the banks of the Alamüdün include Kök-Jar, Tash-Moynok, Besh-Künggöy, and Alamüdün.

There have been reports that the river fills with garbage.  It has also been reported that waste water from certain facilities has been polluting the river, making it unsafe as a source of drinking water.

In July 2015, the river flooded in the village of Arashan.  Relief efforts were hindered by the fact that heavy equipment could not be transported through the village due to narrow streets.

References 

Rivers of Kyrgyzstan